Choustník is a municipality and village in Tábor District in the South Bohemian Region of the Czech Republic. It has about 500 inhabitants.

Administrative parts
Villages of Kajetín and Předboř are administrative parts of Choustník.

Notable people
Václav Vilém Václavíček (1788–1862), Roman Catholic priest and theological writer

References

Villages in Tábor District